John Flinkenberg (15 March 1896 – 2 December 1960) was a Finnish sailor. He competed in the Dragon event at the 1956 Summer Olympics.

References

External links
 

1896 births
1960 deaths
Finnish male sailors (sport)
Olympic sailors of Finland
Sailors at the 1956 Summer Olympics – Dragon
Sportspeople from Vaasa